Giselle González (born Giselle González Salgado in Mexico) is a Mexican telenovelas producer.

Filmography

Awards and nominations

Premios TVyNovelas

Premios Bravo

Premios Mundo Latino

References

External links

Living people
Mexican telenovela producers
1969 births